is the 4th studio album released by singer Maaya Sakamoto. Many of the songs are of a completely different style than her previous work.

Track listing

Charts

References

2003 albums
Maaya Sakamoto albums
Albums produced by Yoko Kanno
Victor Entertainment albums